Angelica breweri is a species of angelica known as Brewer's angelica. It is native to the high mountain ranges of eastern California and far western Nevada, where it grows in coniferous forests. This is a taprooted perennial herb producing an erect, hollow, hairy stem to heights between 1 and 2 meters. The large leaves are composed of many highly dissected leaflets, each up to 10 centimeters long. The inflorescence is a compound umbel with up to 50 long rays holding clusters of hairy white flowers. The base of each pedicel has a thick webbing. The fruit is a pair of ribbed bodies, each containing a seed.

References
Jepson Manual Treatment
USDA Plants Profile
Photo gallery

breweri
Flora of California
Flora of Nevada
Plants described in 1868
Flora without expected TNC conservation status